was a Japanese company that published video games.

Most of the games Smilesoft produced were monster-collecting role-playing video games. It shut down in 2003 after the president of the company, was arrested on April 10 for charges of child prostitution at a female junior high school. After shutting down, the licenses to its games were bought up by Rocket Company.

Games 
 2000
 Keitai Denjū Telefang Power Version (GBC, developed by Natsume)
 Keitai Denjū Telefang Speed Version (GBC, developed by Natsume)
 2001
 Network Bōkenki Bugsite Alpha (GBC, developed by KAZe)
 Network Bōkenki Bugsite Beta (GBC, developed by KAZe)
 2002
 Telefang 2 Power (GBA, developed by Natsume)
 Telefang 2 Speed (GBA, developed by Natsume)
 Gachaste! Dino Device Red (GBA)
 Gachaste! Dino Device Blue (GBA)
 Digital Ehon Vol. 1: Imadoki no Momotarou (PS1)
 Digital Ehon Vol. 2: Imadoki no Kaguya Hime (PS1)
 Digital Ehon Vol. 3: Imadoki no Sarukani (PS1)
 Digital Ehon Vol. 4: Imadoki no Hanasaka Jiisan (PS1)
 Digital Ehon Vol. 5: Imadoki no Urashi Matarou (PS1)
 2003
 Gachaste! Dino Device 2 Blue (GBA)
 Gachaste! Dino Device 2 Blue (GBA)

References

External links

 SmileSoft  (Archive)

Defunct video game companies of Japan
Video game publishers
Japanese companies disestablished in 2003
Video game companies disestablished in 2003